Prionodactylus is a former genus of lizards in the family Gymnophthalmidae. Species that at least at some point have been placed in the genus are reassigned to Arthrosaura, Cercosaura, Echinosaura, Pholidobolus, Placosoma, Proctoporus, Ptychoglossus, and Riolama.

References

Gymnophthalmidae
Lizard genera
Taxa named by Arthur William Edgar O'Shaughnessy